In United States federal agricultural legislation, the Standard Fruits and Vegetable Baskets and Containers Act of 1916  dealt with containers for small fruits and vegetables, and prescribed the exact capacity of the containers.

It fixed the cubic contents for dry half-pint, pint, and quart-size containers.  It made no reference to the dimensions or form of the container, thus leaving it to the individual states to adopt standards in such respects.

The Act was repealed on October 22, 1968, acknowledging the auspices of the Fair Packaging and Labeling Act.

Associated Statutes of 1916 Act
Chronological bills relative to United States laws in accordance with the Standard Fruits and Vegetable Baskets and Containers Act.

See also

 Bushel
 Dry measure
 Farmers' Bulletin
 Fruit picking
 Peck
 Standard Barrel Act For Fruits, Vegetables, and Dry Commodities
 Wine Harvest

External links
 
 
 
 

1916 in American law
64th United States Congress
United States federal commerce legislation